Rafael Alonso Ochoa (5 July 1920 – 24 October 1998) was a Spanish actor. He appeared in more than 120 films and television shows between 1951 and 1998.

Selected filmography

 Malibran's Song (1951)
 Welcome Mr. Marshall! (1953)
 Cabaret (1953)
 Esa pareja feliz (1953)
 Comedians (1954)
 El baile (1959)
 Mi calle (1960)
 My Wedding Night (1961)
 The Mustard Grain (1962)
 Tomy's Secret (1963)
 He's My Man! (1966)
 Sor Citroën (1967)
 The Man Who Wanted to Kill Himself (1970)
 Variety (1971)
 The Doubt (1972)
 The Guerrilla (1973)
 Zorrita Martinez (1975)
 Unmarried Mothers (1975)
 La colmena (1982)
 All Is Possible in Granada (1982)
 On the Far Side of the Tunnel (1994)
 The Grandfather (1998)

References

External links

1920 births
1998 deaths
Spanish male film actors
Spanish male television actors
Male actors from Madrid
Honorary Goya Award winners
20th-century Spanish male actors